The Chevrolet Aveo is a subcompact car (B-segment) marketed by General Motors (GM) since 2002. Originally developed by South Korean manufacturer Daewoo Motors and marketed as the Daewoo Kalos, takeover of Daewoo by GM to form GM Daewoo Auto & Technology (GMDAT) resulted with the car being marketed under seven brands (Chevrolet, Daewoo, ZAZ, Holden, Pontiac, Ravon and Suzuki) in 120 countries, with the Aveo nameplate being the most commonly used one. The second-generation Aveo, developed by GM Korea (formerly GMDAT), was introduced in 2011 and was also marketed as the Chevrolet Sonic in several markets such as in the Americas, Japan, Middle East, South Africa and several Southeast Asian markets. Production of the second-generation model ended in October 2020.

Since 2017, GM imported the Chevrolet Sail sedan from China to be marketed in Mexico and other Central American countries as the Aveo. Developed by GM PATAC in China and produced by joint venture SAIC-GM, it was positioned below the more advanced Sonic. In 2023, GM imported a new version to Mexico in a sedan and hatchback form, this time it is developed and produced by a separate Chinese joint venture, SAIC-GM-Wuling.



First generation (T200; 2002)

T200 

GM Daewoo introduced the Daewoo Kalos in September 2002, based on a new platform, replacing the Daewoo Lanos (T100). Under development before Daewoo's bankruptcy, the Kalos was the company's first new model introduction following its subsequent takeover by General Motors. Manufacture of the Kalos began in early March 2002, with pre-production prototypes shown at the Geneva Auto Show in April 2002. The nameplate Kalos derives from the Greek word καλός (kalós) for "beautiful" and "good".

Originally designed by Italdesign, the Kalos derives directly from the "Kalos Dream" concept vehicle first presented at the 2000 Paris Motor Show and subsequent developmental concepts at the 2001 Frankfurt Motor Show, 2002 Geneva Motor Show, and 2003 Geneva Motor Show. During this three-year development period Daewoo was struggling financially, with the ultimate fate of the company and the concept vehicle remaining uncertain.

The Kalos was sold in three and four available body styles: a 4-door sedan and 5-door hatchback from the beginning of production in 2002, and a 3-door hatchback available in certain European markets beginning in 2005. Two different T200 front-end styling designs were sold. When released in 2002, the T200 headlamps were detached from the horizontal amber turn signal strip, located directly below. This detached style, used primarily in South Korea and North America, was used in conjunction with a semi-elliptical grille. When sales in Europe began in 2003, the headlights were an integrated unit that slanted upwards from the "V-shaped" grille towards the front fenders. In Australia, when the Daewoo Kalos was introduced in 2003, the hatchback featured the integrated lighting arrangement, with the detached style used to differentiate the sedans. In South Korea, where the detached lights were used at first, the integrated design was later utilized as a facelift.

The T200 sedan and five-door hatchback featured a swage line running along the lower body to the rear door, which kinks downward prominently on the five-door. Five-doors also feature a side window in the C/D pillar with a distinctively angled lower edge. Interiors feature a circular motif throughout.

T250 
GM introduced the heavily facelifted sedan at the 2005 Auto Shanghai, designed in cooperation with PATAC. Bearing the internal code T250 and sold in South Korea as the Daewoo Gentra, revisions included exterior styling changes, a new interior instrument panel and minor equipment changes, including increased sound deadening. Incorporation of the radio antenna into the rear glass and extensive wind tunnel testing helped reduce the coefficient of drag from 0.348 to 0.326.

A facelifted hatchback with the sedan's updated dashboard was presented as the Chevrolet Aveo during the 2007 Frankfurt Motor Show, to be marketed globally. The Korean market received its own distinct restyle of the hatchback, the Gentra X, whose bumper without the distinctly "Chevrolet" split grille was also used for the Pontiac, Holden and Suzuki variants.

With launch of the Gentra X in South Korea, GMDAT had replaced engines of T250. 1.2 L (1206 cc) S-TEC II engine was updated with features such as dual overhead camshaft (DOHC) and timing chain (older version has timing belt) system. 1.6 L E-TEC II engine has been replaced with an updated GEN-III Ecotec Family 1 engine with new features such as variable valve timing mechanism.

Ravon Nexia R3 

The refreshed T250 Aveo sedan was launched in Uzbekistan and Russia in 2016 as Ravon Nexia R3. The car is produced at the GM Uzbekistan plant. The Ravon Nexia R3 is available with the 1.5-liter petrol engine (105 hp) paired with the 5-speed manual or the 6-speed automatic.

Second generation (T300; 2012) 

The second generation Aveo debuted at the 2010 Paris Motor Show, using the Gamma II global subcompact platform.

Development of the second-generation Aveo was led by GM Korea, with Opel engineers leading platform development along with significant input from engineers from Australia's Holden and Chevrolet of the United States. The Aveo marked the debut of the Gamma II global subcompact platform. Exterior design was led by Australian designer Ondrej Koromhaz, of Holden who was on assignment to GM Korea from 2005 to 2007. Koromhaz described his goal for the Aveo as being a "four-seat motorcycle" and took design inspiration from motorcycles, notably in the Aveo's exposed headlights and motorcycle-style instrument cluster. For Sonic models built in the United States, the Sonic features suspension tuning by Corvette Racing engineer John Buttermore.

Marketing and production
Chevrolet markets the new Aveo under the Chevrolet Sonic nameplate in the Americas, Japan, Middle East, South Africa and several Southeast Asian markets. In Australia and New Zealand, it was sold as the Holden Barina until stocks ran out in early 2019. In Europe, it retained the "Aveo" name, although sales ended there in 2014 as the Chevrolet brand was discontinued in Europe.

The North American-spec Sonic was available as a 4-door sedan or five-door hatchback. It comes with a 1.8-liter inline-four producing  and  torque, or a 1.4-liter turbo inline-four producing  and  torque. The 1.8-liter engine uses one of few cast-iron block with timing belt; the 1.4-liter turbo engine uses a timing chain to drive the camshafts. The 1.8-liter inline-four is mated to a standard five-speed manual or six-speed automatic transmission, while the 1.4-liter turbo has a six-speed manual transmission. The Sonic is, notably, the only car in its class to be assembled in America. For the 2015 model year, the US Sonic added OnStar, a 1.4-liter turbo engine that became standard on LTZ models, and a new exterior color, Blue Velvet.

On August 2, 2011, the Sonic had entered production at Orion Assembly, with the first cars arriving at dealerships in October. The Sonic was the only subcompact car sold in North America that was built in the United States.

The Sonic used a water-based "three-wet" paint process that eliminates the need for a primer bake oven; this reduced the paint shop footprint by 10%, and used 50% less energy per vehicle painted. Chevy was the first US automaker to use this process.

The Bolt (based on a different platform) joined the Aveo/Sonic on the Orion assembly line in 2016, at a combined rate of 90,000 per year.

Other markets
The Sonic had its Southeast Asian debut at the Bangkok Motor Show in March 2012, as both a 4-door sedan and 5-door hatchback. It was rolled out from GM's facility in Rayong, Thailand in July 2012 as a 4-door sedan. Three trims were available, which are LS, LT and LTZ, in both the 4-door sedan and 5-door hatchback models (the LS would be available only with the 4-door sedan), and powered by the 1.4-liter engine with the option of 5-speed manual or 6-speed automatic transmission. Delivery of the 4-door sedan started in late of July 2012, and the hatchback followed in August 2012. The Thai-built Sonic was exported to other Southeast Asian countries like Philippines, Indonesia and Malaysia. Production ceased in 2015.

The model was unveiled in Japan at the Summer Sonic 2011 event in QVC Marine Field, and went on sale in November 2011. Early models included the 5-door hatchback with a 1.6-litre I-4 Ecotec (115 PS) engine, and a 6-speed automatic transmission with TAPshift. The base model is based on the equivalent of North American LTZ trim level, while the LT model includes alloy wheels and metallic paint.

The Sonic was also assembled at the GM Colmotores plant in Bogotá, Colombia, where it was initially introduced for the domestic market only and later also exported to countries in the Andean region. As of December 2012, production was also underway at the GAZ (Gorky Automobile Plant) plant in Nizhny Novgorod, Russia, but during 2015, the contract was discontinued.

The Barina sold in Australia and New Zealand was sourced from South Korea and only available with the 1.6-liter Family 1 engine, with either a 5-speed manual or conventional 4- or 6-speed automatic.

Facelift 
At the 2016 New York International Auto Show, Chevrolet revealed the refreshed North American version of the Sonic hatchback and sedan. The facelift brought a restyled front fascia, new LED tail lights and refreshed equipment. The Barina sold in Australia and New Zealand was available only with 6-speed conventional automatic, the 4-speed model being dropped, with the same 5-speed manual in the standard model.

The LTZ trim level was renamed Premier for the 2017 model year. The previous RS trim level became a standard appearance package for all Hatchback models (1LT and Premier), and included unique upholstery (cloth trim for the 1LT, and perforated leatherette trim for the Premier), red interior accents and stitching, unique 'RS' badging, and unique aluminum-alloy wheels (16" for LT and 17" for Premier). Since the refresh, the 1LS model was only available as a sedan.

Powertrains

Safety
The Aveo in its most basic Latin American configuration with no airbags and no ABS received 0 stars for adult occupants and 2 stars for toddlers from Latin NCAP in 2015.

The Aveo in its most basic Latin American configuration with 2 airbags and no ESC received 0 stars for adult occupants and 3 stars for toddlers from Latin NCAP in 2017 (one level above 2010-2015).

Marketing
In marketing the Sonic, GM had the car driven by skateboarder Rob Dyrdek in a full 360-degree rotation (referred to as a kickflip) off a ramp and over an oversized skateboard. In addition, GM produced a commercial for Super Bowl XLVI called "Stunt Anthem", which featured the kickflip, as well as other Sonics skydiving, doing a bungee jump, and scenes from OK Go's music video for the song "Needing/Getting." The song featured in the commercial is "We Are Young" by Fun.

Discontinuation 
The Sonic was discontinued in Canada after the 2018 model year. In March 2019, the Aveo was discontinued in South Korea. Chevrolet discontinued the Sonic after the 2020 model year in the United States, due to GM's plans to convert the Orion Assembly to EV production and declining sales. There are no plans for a successor. The Sonic ended production on October 20, 2020.

Chevrolet Sail-based Aveo (2017) 

In several Central American countries, the Aveo nameplate is used for the third-generation Chevrolet Sail sedan, which went on sale in Mexico in November 2017 for the 2019 model year to replace the first-generation Aveo sedan. The Chinese-made Sail was renamed as to avoid being related to the second-generation Sail, which obtained zero star rating in Latin NCAP in 2015 in a variant without airbags. It was marketed alongside the Sonic as a more budget offering until the latter's discontinuation.

Third generation (310C; 2023) 

The new generation Aveo was introduced in December 2022 and launched in February 2023 for the Mexican market for the 2024 model year. Available as a 5-door hatchback and 4-door sedan, it is developed and produced by SAIC-GM-Wuling under the model code 310C.

Sales will start in the first half of 2023, while pre-production had started in August 2022.

Sales

References

External links 

 Official websites for Australia, Canada, U.S. (Sonic)

Aveo
GM Korea vehicles
Front-wheel-drive vehicles
Subcompact cars
Sedans
Hatchbacks
Euro NCAP superminis
Latin NCAP superminis
Cars introduced in 2002
2010s cars